Mangelia guerichi is a minute extinct species of sea snail, a marine gastropod mollusk in the family Mangeliidae.

Description

Distribution
This extinct marine species was found in Miocene strata of Nordrhein Westfalen, Germany; age range: 20.43 to 15.97 Ma

References

 H. Moths, F. Albrecht, and G. Stein. 2010. Die molluskenfauna (Hermmorium, Untermiozän) aus der Kiesgrube kirnke bei Werder (Nordwest-Niedersachsen). Palaeofocus 3:1-155

External links
 Fossilworks : Mangelia guerichi

guerichi
Gastropods described in 1925